Islington South West was a Parliamentary constituency in the Metropolitan Borough of Islington, in North London.

It returned one Member of Parliament (MP)  to the House of Commons of the Parliament of the United Kingdom from 1950 until it was abolished for the February 1974 general election.

Boundaries
The Metropolitan Borough of Islington wards of Barnsbury, Lower Holloway, St Mary, St Peter, and Thornhill.

Members of Parliament

Election results

Elections in the 1950s

Elections in the 1960s

Election in the 1970s

See also
 List of parliamentary constituencies in London

References

Parliamentary constituencies in London (historic)
Constituencies of the Parliament of the United Kingdom established in 1950
Constituencies of the Parliament of the United Kingdom disestablished in 1974
Politics of the London Borough of Islington